The War You Don't See is a 2010 British documentary film written, produced and directed by John Pilger with Alan Lowery, which challenges the media for the role they played in the Iraq, Afghanistan, and Israel/Palestine conflicts.

Participants
 Professor Stuart Ewen – media historian
 Professor Melvin Goodman – former CIA analyst
 Dan Rather – CBS Evening News anchor and managing editor, 1981–2005
 Bryan Whitman – US Assist. Secretary of Defence
 Rageh Omaar – BBC world affairs reporter, 2000–2006
 Dahr Jamail – journalist & author, Beyond the Green Zone
 David Rose – former Observer journalist
 Steve Rendall – Fairness & Accuracy in Reporting
 Fran Unsworth – BBC Head of Newsgathering
 David Manion – Editor in Chief, ITV News
 Mark Curtis – historian & author, Web of Deceit
 Phil Shiner – Public Interest Lawyers
 Guy Smallman – war reporter & photographer
 Carne Ross – British Foreign Office, 1989–2004
 Professor Greg Philo – Glasgow University Media Group
 Cynthia McKinney – former US Congresswoman
 Julian Assange – Editor in Chief, WikiLeaks

Reception

The Guardian film reviewer Peter Bradshaw states that, "The force of his film is in its contention that the colossal scale of civilian casualties is, within the grammar of news, downgraded in importance so that it doesn't figure as news at all, but as all-but-invisible deep background to be ignored". "Pilger gives due respect to WikiLeaks," he concludes, "although his praise for al-Jazeera's independence is ironic, given that WikiLeaks has just revealed the possibility that the Qatar government is manipulating the channel."

The Guardian television reviewer John Crace states that, "Pilger has never traded in anything other than black and white," and "Pilger's starting point is that all governments are shysters whose only interest is economic and all journalists are witless dupes," which, "had the feel of slight overkill," but "For all his lack of subtlety, he presents his case with passion and conviction." "What shone through," he concludes, "was that those we rely on to think clearly in times of war are often those most seduced by myopic machismo and that any sense of history gets instantly forgotten."

John Lloyd wrote in the Financial Times that Pilger asserted the British and American media tried to advocate that "wars were noble, should be fought, and that death for one’s country was both sweet, and right". Lloyd thought that individuals disagreeing with Pilger's interpretation were "ruthlessly marshalled into a narrative that gave them no quarter" and that by juxtaposing "two strongly put points of view" those watching "could have made up" their own minds. According to Lloyd, Pilger "showed, in his demolition of propaganda – which is what he calls government statements or politicians’ arguments – the mastery of the propagandist arts".

Total Film reviewer Tom Dawson describes the film as a, "timely, potent doc," with, "an impressive range of interviewees, including 'embedded' war correspondents and whistleblowers," but concludes that, "it's the leaked footage of a US chopper attack on unarmed Baghdad residents that proves the film’s most disturbing scoop."

References

External links
 John Pilger: Why are wars not being reported honestly? by John Pilger in The Guardian (10 December 2010)
 Listening Post: Interview with John Pilger on AlJazeera (23 December 2010)
 
 

2010 documentary films
2010 films
British documentary films
Criticism of journalism
Documentary films about the Iraq War
Documentary films about the media
Documentary films presented by John Pilger
2010s English-language films
2010s British films